Myndtown is a civil parish in Shropshire, England.  It contains eight listed buildings that are recorded in the National Heritage List for England.  Of these, one is at Grade II*, the middle of the three grades, and the others are at Grade II, the lowest grade.  The parish contains the villages of Asterton and Myndtown and the surrounding countryside.  Apart from a church that originated in the 12th century, all the listed buildings are houses, cottages, farmhouses, and farm buildings.

 

Key

Buildings

References

Citations

Sources

Lists of buildings and structures in Shropshire